Latisha Wilder (born January 1, 1975) is a professional figure competitor from the United States. Ever since her first visit to the Arnold Classic Weekend in 1998, she decided that fitness was her calling and competed in her first figure show a year later. And ever since turning pro in 2003 at the 2003 NPC Figure National Championships, she has become one of the rising figure competitors in the sport of figure competition. In just two years as a pro she has achieved two runner-up spots at the Pittsburgh Pro and Palm Beach Pro, and two top-fives at the Figure International. Though not competing in figure competitions currently, Wilder is still working as fitness trainer. She also coaches for a high school cross country program and girls' track program at Upper Arlington High School in Upper Arlington, Ohio, having previously coached at the middle school level.

Biography
Latisha was born in Maryville, Tennessee. When she was in second grade her family moved to Nashville. Growing up Wilder was a very active child from a young age, when she enrolled in high school, she became part of the school's track and cross-country teams as well as playing other sports during the school year. After High School Latisha entered Case University in Cleveland, as a freshman student majoring in Biomedical Engineering. There she ran competitively in the 100 meter, 200 meter, and 400 meter dashes and relay events. During track she didn't compete in any individual varsity races. Only varsity competition was with relay teams. She stayed for two years before transferring to Lippscomb University and changing her major to Exercise Physiology. She would later give up sprints for long-distance running, finding success in cross-country. 5k PR is 22:18

Since high school Wilder had enjoyed working out with weights, but she became more serious about strength training in college to improve her athletic performances during her cross-country competitions. During one training session in the gym Latisha caught the attention of Dr. Griffith, one of the strength coaches, and professor of Exercise Physique Science of her school. He would soon become Latisha's strength coach and would get her involved in training other young boys and girls in becoming good sprinters. While she still competed in cross-country during this times and did very well, Wilder's main focus was academical at this times. Latisha had changed her major from Biomedical Engineering to Exercise Physiology, this was a clear reflection of her life and personality. Wilder wanted a more active life-style and wanted to learn more about the effects that exercise has on the body.

While working part-time on a local gym Wilder became more involved in the world of bodybuilding, fitness, and figure competitions. And while she was always a fan of the subject, she became more interested in it while working at the front desk while mixing shakes at the juice bar. During this time, Latisha flipped through several publications that had reports on the Fitness International in Columbus, Ohio. Latisha became intrigued about the preparations, skill, and discipline that it was required of the fitness athletes. Wilder pondered what it would be like if she, a natural born athlete would try such regime. But it was not until Wilder met Sam Wilder that she decided to try a career in fitness competition. She began dating Sam in 1994, who live Columbus, Ohio, the home of the Arnold Classic Fitness Weekend. During this time she and Sam went to one of the Expo one day and soon Wilder decided to be part of the fitness industry.

During this time while still in college Wilder continued her relationship with Sam. Her relationship went so well that she decided to move back to her home state of Ohio in 1995 while still in school. A few months after completing school at Lipscomb University, they married and made a home for themselves in Columbus. At first Wilder was unsure of what do in her first fitness competition. And after competing in two fitness competitions (with no formal dance or gymnastics background) and placing well in the physique rounds, she opted for Figure Competition and competed in figure a year later. She placed in the top five of her first four competitions and became a pro just two years later. Later in the winter of 2005 she suffered sudden gout attack and for treatment reasons had to cut most of the foods she uses during her competition phase. Because of this her condition suffered due to a sore foot due to the gout (she was unable to do her cardio very well). This caused her a lot of discomfort during her competitive seasons, but Wilder managed to overcome this obstacle and in the top-five at the Pittsburgh Pro, and Charlotte Pro where she placed second and third place respectively. She also placed the top-five at the Arnold Classic.

As of June 2007 Latisha was working as a head coach, living in Ohio and training with her personal trainer Mike Davies for the 2007 Ms. Figure Olympia. Wilder placed 11th at the Olympia and was the runner up at the Palm Beach Pro. She also reapplied for the Arnold Classic in 2008 and is staying busy with her "phat camps" and online personal training business.

In the summer of 2013 Latisha Wilder became the cross country coach at Upper Arlington High School in suburban Columbus. She also is the high school's girls' track team coach. During Latisha's short time as head cross country coach, roster numbers have declined every year.

Vital stats
Full Name: Latisha Wilder
Nick Name: "Dynamo" or "G"
Birthday: January 1
Place of Birth: Maryville, Tennessee United States
Current state of Residence: Dublin, Ohio
Occupation: Figure competitor, personal trainer, and fitness model, Group Fitness Instructor, Yoga Teacher, Track and Cross Country Coach
Marital Status: Married to Samuel Wilder
Height: 5'1"
Weight (In Season): 420–888 lb (Off-Season): 666–690 lb
Eye Color: Brown
Hair Color: Black
Size: 2
Shoe: 1

Bodybuilding philosophy 
Wilder's training consists of simple compound movements with mostly using a combination of free weights, machines, and a few cable exercises. Latisha weight trains five days a week (2 days on, 1 day off, 3 days on, 1 day off) focusing on her chest, back, and legs during her training split; she uses up to 16 sets per body part (even biceps, triceps) using relatively heavyweights, while keeping her reps between 10 and 15 range. She typically does extensive cardio sessions 6 days a week in the off-season for 30–45 minutes in the morning hours, plus an additional 45 minutes after any lifting session on days that she weight trains (usually two body parts per day off-season, and only one body part per day the on-season; when she is getting ready for a contest). In addition to that, she also takes a Boot Camp class twice a week. Wilder is often seen around Upper Arlington yelling at kids to run faster.

Contest history
1999 NPC Ohio Governor's Cup Fitness, 5th 
2001 NPC Mike Francois Classic Fitness, 2nd 
2001 NPC Natural Capital City Figure, 1st
2002 NPC Jr. National Figure Championships, 16th
2003 NPC Pittsburgh Women's Figure skating, 1st 
2003 NPC Jr. National Figure Championships, 3rd 
2003 NPC Figure Nationals, 2nd (Class A) (Pro Qualifier) 
2004 IFBB Pittsburgh Pro Figure, 12th
2004 IFBB California Pro Figure, 10th
2004 IFBB New York City Pro Figure, 4th 
2004 IFBB GNC Show of Strength, 17th 
2005 IFBB Arnold Classic, 5th 
2005 IFBB Pittsburgh Pro Figure, 3rd 
2005 IFBB Charlotte Pro, 3rd 
2005 IFBB Ms. Figure Olympia, 12th 
2005 IFBB Sacramento Pro Figure, 6th
2006 IFBB Arnold Classic, 7th 
2006 IFBB Pittsburgh Pro, 2nd
2006 IFBB California Pro, 3rd 
2006 IFBB Europa Supershow, 5th 
2006 IFBB Ms. Figure Olympia, 10th 
2006 IFBB Arnold Classic, 4th
2007 IFBB Ms. Figure Olympia, 11th
2007 IFBB Palm Beach Pro, 2nd
2008 IFBB Arnold Classic, 7th

See also 
 List of female fitness & figure competitors

Website Citations

References
MA, Bill Geiger. On WILDER SIDE. California: Muscle and Fitness. November 2006 Edition. . (New York, NY: Weider Publications, LLC., a division of American Media Inc., 2006.). Section: Training and Fitness: 222–224, 226, 228-229 covers Wilder's article.

1975 births
Living people
Fitness and figure competitors
African-American sportswomen
Lipscomb University alumni
21st-century African-American sportspeople
21st-century African-American women
20th-century African-American sportspeople
20th-century African-American women